Chiril Lucinschi (born 14 November 1970) is a Moldovan politician and businessman, who served as member of Parliament of Moldova between December 2010 – February 2017, in the faction of the Liberal Democratic Party of Moldova. He also was a professional basketball player, and between 1999 and 2004 was President of the Basketball Federation of Moldova. He is son of the second President of Moldova, Petru Lucinschi.

Biography 
Between 2004 and 2008 he was deputy president of National Olympic Committee of Moldova.

Chiril Lucinschi is the President of directors board of "AnaliticMedia-Grup" S.A., and is owner of two TV channels – TV8 and ТНТ Bravo – Moldova.

On 22 February 2017 Chiril Lucinschi announced that he is dropping his MP mandate and leaves the Liberal Democratic Party.

On 25 May 2017 Chiril Lucinschi was retained by Anti-Corruption prosecutors being suspected of involvement in the 2014 Moldovan bank fraud scandal. He stated then that he is not guilty. On 27 May Lucinschi was placed under home arrest for 30 days, this term being prolonged for another 30 days on 24 June, and one more time on 20 July. On 1 August 2017 the Anti-Corruption Prosecution Office has completed the criminal investigation and filed the Lucinschi case to trial. According to the Prosecution Office press-release, a company which Lucinschi is a beneficiary of, got a loan of 5 million lei from the later-failed Moldovan bank "Unibank" in 2013, and then transferred $401,650 to a company group out of the country, and finally, to the accounts of Rouseau Alliance LP, which consequently pays back the loan to later-failed "Banca de Economii" (BEM). Moreover, during 2012–2014, several off-shore companies transferred some $440,000 to IPA International Project Agency. It was reportedly proven later that the funds originate from the fraudulent loans from BEM, Unibank and Banca Socială through off-shore firms. According to the prosecutors Lucinschi risks up to 10 years of imprisonment for alleged money laundering and not declaring ownership.

References

External links

Chiril Lucinschi on parlament.md
Chiril Lucinschi on facebook
Chiril Lucinschi on twitter

Living people
Diplomats from Chișinău
Moldovan MPs 2010–2014
Moldovan MPs 2014–2018
Businesspeople from Chișinău
Liberal Democratic Party of Moldova MPs
Children of national leaders
Moldovan men's basketball players
Sportspeople from Chișinău
1970 births